The 2009 Toronto Nationals season was the first for the franchise. Their first game in the MLL was on May 15, 2009 against Washington Bayhawks, which they won 17–16.  They also won their first home game over the Chicago Machine 15–11.  The Nationals qualified for the playoffs as the second seed with a 7–5 record and the best offense in MLL with 184 goals for. The Nationals played their first playoff game against the Long Island Lizards at Navy–Marine Corps Memorial Stadium in Annapolis, Maryland. Toronto won their semi-final matchup 14–13 thanks to a strong game by Merrick Thomson scoring 4 goals. Toronto went on to face the Denver Outlaws in the Steinfeld Cup Final. The Nationals were tied with the Outlaws 9–9 with over a minute to go in the game. Nationals head coach Dave Huntley called a time-out to draw out a strategy. With 45 seconds left to go, Joe Walters passed to Shawn Williams and Williams scored the winning goal to give the Toronto Nationals their first championship victory 10–9 over the Denver Outlaws. Merrick Thomson was named Playoff MVP and Brodie Merrill won the Major League Lacrosse Defensive player of the Year Award.

Standings 
W = Wins, L = Losses, PCT = Winning Percentage, GB = Games Back of first place, GF = Goals For, 2ptGF = 2 point Goals For, GA = Goals Against, 2ptGA = 2 point Goals Against

Long Island finished ahead of Boston based on a head to head record of 3-0.

Schedule

Playoffs

References

External links

Toronto Nationals Season, 2009
Hamilton Nationals seasons
2009 in Canadian sports
Toronto Nationals